Tropidophorus robinsoni, Robinson's water skink or Robinson's keeled skink,  is a species of skink found in Myanmar and Thailand.

References

robinsoni
Reptiles of Myanmar
Reptiles of Thailand
Reptiles described in 1919
Taxa named by Malcolm Arthur Smith